Boris Gáll (born 27 April 1994) is a Slovak professional footballer who plays as a winger for 2. Liga club FC Košice.

Career
He made his professional debut for MFK Košice the club in a 1–1 away Corgoň Liga draw against ViOn Zlaté Moravce on 28 September 2013.

References

External links
MFK Košice profile

1994 births
Living people
Sportspeople from Košice
Slovak footballers
Association football midfielders
FC VSS Košice players
FC Lokomotíva Košice players
FC Košice (2018) players
Slovak Super Liga players
2. Liga (Slovakia) players
3. Liga (Slovakia) players